As an additional question in the 1977 referendum, the voters were polled on which song they would prefer to be played as the de facto national anthem (in place of "God Save the Queen"). Voting on this question was not compulsory.  This was the third plebiscite to be held in Australia, following two regarding military service in 1916 and 1917. The winner, "Advance Australia Fair", was later formally declared the Australian anthem in 1984.

Background
Prior to 1974, "God Save the Queen" was Australia's national anthem. In 1974, the Whitlam government performed a nationwide opinion survey, conducted through the Australian Bureau of Statistics, to determine the song to be sung on occasions of national significance. "Advance Australia Fair" was chosen and was enshrined as the national song, to be used on all occasions excepting those of a specifically regal nature.

In January 1976, the Fraser government reinstated "God Save the Queen" for royal, vice-regal, defence and loyal toast occasions, and made plans to conduct a national poll to find a song for use on ceremonial occasions when it was desired to mark a separate Australian identity.

Results
Voters were presented with the following choice: ''Against the background that 'GOD SAVE THE QUEEN' is the NATIONAL ANTHEM to be played on Regal and Vice Regal occasions, electors may indicate their preferences as to which of the tunes of the songs listed below they would prefer to be played on other occasions.

See also
 Referendums in Australia

References

Plebiscite
1977 referendums
1977 (National Song)
Song
Multiple-choice referendums